Sidney George Bedford (1897 – 18 September 1958), known as Sid or Ginger Bedford, was an English professional footballer who played as a half-back in the Football League for Northampton Town, Brighton & Hove Albion and Luton Town. He also played non-league football for Rushden Town with whom he won the 1926–27 Northamptonshire League title.

References

1897 births
1958 deaths
Footballers from Northampton
English footballers
Association football wing halves
Northampton Town F.C. players
Brighton & Hove Albion F.C. players
Luton Town F.C. players
Rushden Town F.C. players
English Football League players